Waleed Khalid (Arabic:وليد خالد) (born 2 August 1992) is an Emirati footballer who plays as a winger .

Career

Dubai
Waleed Khalid started his career at Dubai and is a product of the Dubai's youth system. On 30 September 2010, Waleed Khalid made his professional debut for Dubai against Al-Wahda in the Pro League, replacing Ali Hassan Ahmed.

Ajman
On 7 August 2017, left Dubai and signed with Ajman. On 15 September 2017, Hussain Abdulrahman made his professional debut for Ajman against Al-Jazira in the Pro League, replacing Mohammed Hilal.

References

External links
 

1992 births
Living people
Emirati footballers
Dubai CSC players
Ajman Club players
Hatta Club players
UAE Pro League players
UAE First Division League players
Association football wingers
Place of birth missing (living people)